Micronesian Pidgin is an English-based pidgin language spoken in nineteenth-century Micronesia. It may have been related to Melanesian Pidgin English, due to a number of workers from Melanesia.

English-speaking traders dominated the area from about 1840, and unstable pidgins were in use by 1860. It may have creolized in some beach communities of Kusaie, but no data is available. In 1899 the area passed to German control, and since English pidgin was not used for local inter-ethnic communication, it quickly disappeared: It had been replaced by German by the time German control ended in 1919. The one exception is on Nauru, where it appears to have combined with Chinese Pidgin English to create Nauruan Pidgin English.

Micronesia includes the Carolines (divided between the Palau and the Federated States of Micronesia), the Marshalls, the Marianas (divided between the Northern Marianas and Guam), and the Gilberts (where the most populated part of Kiribati is located) as well as isolates like Wake Island, Nauru and Banaba.

There are only 15–30 native speakers left worldwide.

References
Notes

Bibliography
Ulrich Ammon, 1992, Status Change of Languages

English-based pidgins and creoles
Languages of the Federated States of Micronesia
Languages attested from the 19th century